Olula del Río is a municipality of Almería province, in the autonomous community of Andalusia, Spain.

Located in the Almanzora valley, neighbouring villages are Macael, Purchena and Fines.

The village hosts the Museum Casa Ibáñez, a remarkable repository of modern and contemporary art including pictures of the Olula-born artist Andrés García Ibáñez and other works from Ibáñez personal collection.

Demographics

References

External links
  Olula del Río - Sistema de Información Multiterritorial de Andalucía
  Olula del Río - Diputación Provincial de Almería

Municipalities in the Province of Almería